Cynometra engleri is a species of plant in the family Fabaceae. It is found only in Tanzania.

Taxonomy

References

engleri
Endemic flora of Tanzania
Vulnerable plants
Taxonomy articles created by Polbot